Copal tree may refer to several tree species:

Trees yielding copal resin
Protium copal, a tree endemic to Mexico and Central America
Hymenaea courbaril, also called Brazilian copal tree, a tree common in the Caribbean, Central America, and South America
Hymenaea verrucosa, also called Zanzibar copal tree, a tree native to tropical East Africa

Trees yielding copal wood (used in woodcarving)
 Bursera bipinnata, a tree widespread across Mexico and Central America
 Bursera glabrifolia, a tree native to central Mexico